Physula is a genus of litter moths of the family Erebidae.

Selected species
Physula acutalis Herrich-Schaffer, 1870
Physula albipunctilla Schaus, 1916
Physula albirenalis  Herrich-Schaffer, 1870
Physula anchisa  (Druce, 1891)
Physula apicalis  Herrich-Schaffer, 1870
Physula aristina  Schaus, 1916
Physula cristina  Schaus, 1916
Physula ecuadoralis  Schaus, 1916
Physula herminialis  Herrich-Schaffer, 1870
Physula inscitalis  Schaus, 1916
Physula limonalis  (Schaus, 1913)
Physula margotalis  (Schaus, 1906)
Physula migralis  Guenee, 1854
Physula novitata  Kaye, 1901
Physula paganacalis  Schaus, 1916
Physula peckii  Moschler, 1890
Physula rona  (Schaus, 1912)
Physula synnaralis  Guenee, 1862
Physula tristigatalis Herrich-Schaffer, 1870
Physula variegalis  Herrich-Schaffer, 1870

References

Natural History Museum Lepidoptera genus database

Herminiinae
Moth genera